Grigory Viktorovich Anikeyev (born February 28, 1972, in Dutovo, Komi Republic) is a Russian politician and member of the State Duma of the Russian Federation.

Anikeyev draw attention in April 2018 when he was named the member of State Duma of the Russian Federation with the highest income in 2017. According to his personal tax declaration, his 2017 income amounted to RUB 4.3 BN (close to $70 MM), showing an astonishing 717% growth from 2016.

State Duma deputy Andrey Anikeyev is Grigory's cousin.

References 

1972 births
Living people
People from the Komi Republic
United Russia politicians
Fifth convocation members of the State Duma (Russian Federation)
Sixth convocation members of the State Duma (Russian Federation)
Seventh convocation members of the State Duma (Russian Federation)
Russian businesspeople
Recipients of the Medal of the Order "For Merit to the Fatherland" II class
Eighth convocation members of the State Duma (Russian Federation)